Zaaki (foaled 15 February 2015) is a British bred and Australian trained thoroughbred racehorse that has won multiple Group One races and as of November 5th 2022 is the best racehorse in Australia over 2000m with a record of 2-1 over Godolphin superstar Anamoe (excluding the 2040m 2022 Cox Plate over further).

Background

Ahmad Alotaibi bought Zaaki for 40,000 Guineas at the 2016 Tattersalls October Yearling Sale out of the Staffordstown draft.

Racing career

Originally trained by Mohamed Moubarak, Zaaki went winless from 4 starts in the 2017 season. 

In 2018 he was transferred to the stables of Sir Michael Stoute and was successful  at his first start for his new trainer on the 21 April at Thirsk.

In 2019 he won the Strensall Stakes at York, the Diomed Stakes at Epsom and the Paradise Stakes at Ascot.

Zaaki was sold at the 2020 Tattersalls Autumn Horses in Training Sale for 150,000 Guineas.  He was purchased by Blandford Bloodstock with the intention to be raced and trained in Australia.

In Australia, Zaaki has won four Group One races, the Doomben Cup, Underwood Stakes and Mackinnon Stakes twice.

On 19 March 2022 Zaaki, ridden by Jamie Kah, won the $5.43M All Star Mile at Flemington over 1600m from I'm Thunderstruck and Streets of Avalon.

Pedigree

References 

Racehorses bred in the United Kingdom
Racehorses trained in Australia
2015 racehorse births
Thoroughbred family 1-w